Adai is a town in the Federally Administered Tribal Areas of Pakistan. It is located at 34°57'54N 71°33'53E with an altitude of 1376 metres (4517 feet).

References

Populated places in Khyber Pakhtunkhwa